Sawdust is a compilation album by American rock band the Killers, released on November 9, 2007, by Island Records. The album consists of B-sides, rarities, covers, remixes, and two singles, recorded between 2002 and 2007.

Background

The album was first mentioned by Brandon Flowers in an interview with Billboard in late August 2007. Rolling Stone revealed the name of the compilation in its "Smoking Section" on September 6, 2007. Sawdust was inspired by B-sides collections such as Oasis' The Masterplan, the Smashing Pumpkins' Pisces Iscariot and Nirvana's Incesticide.

"Our most metal song is 'All the Pretty Faces' on Sawdust…" observed guitarist Dave Keuning. "That's a part of who I am. When you're in eighth grade, you're into AC/DC and Metallica. And any guitarist who says they weren't is fucking lying."

Commercial performance
Sawdust debuted at number 12 on the US Billboard 200, selling 82,000 copies in its first week. The album was certified platinum by the British Phonographic Industry (BPI) on April 4, 2008, and had sold 493,000 copies in the United Kingdom by August 2020. It was also certified platinum by the Irish Recorded Music Association (IRMA) for sales of 15,000 copies.

Track listing

Notes
  signifies an additional producer
  signifies a remixer

Charts

Weekly charts

Year-end charts

Certifications

References

2007 compilation albums
Albums produced by Alan Moulder
Albums produced by Flood (producer)
B-side compilation albums
Island Records compilation albums
The Killers compilation albums
Vertigo Records compilation albums